Something Personal is an album by American jazz pianist Jack Wilson featuring performances recorded and released on the Blue Note label in 1967.

Reception
The Allmusic review by Scott Yanow awarded the album 4½ stars and stated "this album is an excellent showcase for the often-overlooked Jack Wilson".

Track listing
All compositions by Jack Wilson except as indicated

 "Most Unsoulful Woman" - 6:53
 "The Sphinx" (Ornette Coleman) - 5:07
 "Shosh" - (Blues in F) 8:59
 "Serenata" (Leroy Anderson) - 6:58
 "Harbor Freeway 5 P.M." - 7:12
 "C.F.D." - 4:58
 "One and Four" [aka. "Mr. Day"] (John Coltrane) - 4:51 Bonus track on CD reissue

Recorded  on August 9 (4, 6-7) and August 10 (1-3, 5), 1966.

Personnel
Jack Wilson - piano
Roy Ayers - vibes
Ray Brown - bass (#3-6), cello (#1-2)
Charles 'Buster' Williams - bass (#1-2)
Varney Barlow - drums

References

Blue Note Records albums
Jack Wilson (jazz pianist) albums
1967 albums
Albums recorded at Van Gelder Studio